This is a list of the largest Hindu temples in terms of area.

Current largest temples

Under construction

See also
 List of tallest Gopurams
 List of large temple tanks
 List of human stampedes in Hindu temples
 Lists of Hindu temples by country

References

Further reading 
.

Lists of Hindu temples
 
Hinduism-related lists
 
 L
Hindu temples